The Director and Deputy Assistant Secretary of Labor for OFCCP is the head of the Office of Federal Contract Compliance Programs.

List of Directors and Deputy Assistant Secretaries of Labor for OFCCP
This is a complete list of all past and present Directors and Deputy Assistant Secretaries of Labor for OFCCP.

Notes

References

OFCCP
OFCCP